The 2011 World Indoor Bowls Championship was held at Potters Leisure Resort, Hopton on Sea, Great Yarmouth, England, from 5 to 23 January 2011.

Winners

Draw and results

Men's singles

Finals

Top half

Bottom half

Women's singles

Open Pairs

Mixed Pairs

References

External links
Official website

2011 in bowls
World Indoor Bowls Championship